Discovery is the second studio album by the French electronic music duo Daft Punk, released on 12 March 2001 by Virgin Records. It marked a shift from the Chicago house of their first album, Homework (1997), to a house style more heavily inspired by disco, post-disco, garage house, and R&B. The Daft Punk member Thomas Bangalter described Discovery as an exploration of song structures, musical forms and childhood nostalgia, compared to the "raw" electronic music of Homework.

Discovery was recorded at Bangalter's home in Paris between 1998 and 2000. It features extensive sampling; some samples are from older records, while others were recorded by Daft Punk playing instruments. The electronic musicians Romanthony, Todd Edwards, and DJ Sneak collaborated on some tracks. For the  music videos, Daft Punk developed a concept involving the merging of science fiction with the entertainment industry. Inspired by their childhood love for Japanese anime, the duo collaborated with Leiji Matsumoto to produce Interstella 5555: The 5tory of the 5ecret 5tar 5ystem, an anime film with the entirety of Discovery as the soundtrack.

Before Discoverys release, Daft Punk adopted robot costumes. They also launched Daft Club, a website which featured exclusive tracks and other bonus material. Discovery was a critical and commercial success, peaking high across several charts internationally on release. Critics praised Daft Punk for innovating in house music as they had done with Homework. The album produced six singles; "One More Time" was its most successful, and became a club hit. In 2020, Rolling Stone included Discovery at number 236 in its updated list of "The 500 Greatest Albums of All Time".

Background
After their debut album Homework was released, Thomas Bangalter and Guy-Manuel de Homem-Christo spent most of 1997 touring on the Daftendirektour. For the first half of 1998, the duo was focused on their own personal labels, while also working on the video collection D.A.F.T.: A Story About Dogs, Androids, Firemen and Tomatoes. In 1999 and 2000, their time was split between making music for their own labels and recording Discovery. Bangalter noted that Homework influenced many other artists to mimic its sound, prompting Daft Punk to pursue a different direction to better distinguish themselves.

Recording
Discovery was recorded in the duo's own studio, Daft House, located at Bangalter's home in Paris, France. Daft Punk started work on the album in 1998, and produced it over the course of two years. Bangalter and Homem-Christo made music together and separately, in a similar process to their debut album Homework. Although they used the same equipment as they had for Homework, the duo sought to record tracks that were more concise than their previous work. For Discovery, the group used different samplers and synthesizers, including Akai MPC, E-mu SP-1200, Oberheim DMX and LinnDrum. The track "Short Circuit", which features a Sequential Circuits drum pattern, was previously heard in Daft Punk's 1997 live sets. For vocoders, the group used a Roland SVC-350, and a DigiTech Vocalist. Production on the album also incorporated a PC with Auto-Tune and an early version of Logic. Every track on Discovery uses a different phase shifter. The album was mastered by Nilesh Patel, who also had mastered Homework.

One of the first tracks to come out of the Discovery sessions, "One More Time", was completed in 1998 and was left "sitting on a shelf" until its single release in 2000. After completing "Too Long" early in the album's production, Daft Punk decided that they "didn't want to do 14 more house tracks" in the way the genre is usually defined, and thus set out to incorporate a variety of styles for the record. The album features musical contributions from Romanthony, Todd Edwards, and DJ Sneak. Homem-Christo noted that Romanthony and Edwards were two of the producers that had a big influence on Daft Punk. The duo had wanted to work with them on Homework, but found it difficult to convince them to do so since Daft Punk were still relatively unknown. DJ Sneak wrote the lyrics to "Digital Love" and assisted in the song's production.

Music

Theme
Discovery is recognized as a concept album. It relates strongly to Daft Punk's childhood memories, incorporating their love of cinema and character. Thomas Bangalter specified that the album deals with the duo's experiences growing up in the decade between 1975 and 1985, rather than it just being a tribute to the music of that period. The record was designed to reflect a playful, honest and open-minded attitude toward listening to music. Bangalter compared it to the state of childhood when one does not judge or analyze music. Bangalter noted the stylistic approach of the album was in contrast to that of their previous effort. "Homework [...] was a way to say to the rock kids, like, 'Electronic music is cool'. Discovery was the opposite, of saying to the electronic kids, 'Rock is cool, you know? You can like that.'" He elaborated that Homework had been "a rough and raw thing" focused on sound production and texture, whereas the goal with Discovery was to explore song structures and new musical forms. This change in sound was inspired by Aphex Twin's "Windowlicker".

Composition
Discovery is a departure from Daft Punk's previous house sound. In his review for AllMusic, John Bush wrote that Discovery is "definitely the New York garage edition" of Homework. He added that Daft Punk produced a "glammier, poppier" sound of Eurodisco and R&B by over-embellishing their pitch-bend, and vocoder effects, including loops of divas, synth-guitars, and electric piano. Stylus Magazines Keith Gwillim asserted that it is a disco album that draws on the genre's "danceable" and "sappy" elements, including its processed vocals and "prefabricated" guitar solos. Other critics also described the album as post-disco. Retrospectively, Uproxx said the album also incorporates French house.

The album's opening track, "One More Time", features heavily Auto-Tuned and compressed vocals from Romanthony. The next track, "Aerodynamic", has a funk groove, halt for an electric guitar solo, and ending with a separate "spacier" electronic segment. This solo, which contains guitar arpeggios, was compared to Yngwie Malmsteen by Pulse!. "Digital Love" contains a solo performed by the duo using a Wurlitzer piano, vintage synthesizers and music sequencers; it incorporates elements of pop, new wave, jazz, funk and disco. "Harder, Better, Faster, Stronger", the fourth track on the album is an electro-leaning song. It is followed by "Crescendolls", an instrumental. "Nightvision" is an ambient track. "Superheroes" leans toward the "acid minimalism" of Homework. "High Life" is built over a "gibberish" vocal sample, and contains an organ-like section. "Something About Us" is a downtempo song, with digitally processed vocals by Daft Punk and lounge rhythms.

"Voyager" has guitar riffs, harp-like 80s synths, and a funky bassline. "Veridis Quo" is a "faux-orchestral" synthesizer baroque song; according to Angus Harrison, its title is a pun on the words "very disco". "Short Circuit" is an electro-R&B song with breakbeats and programmed drum patterns. "Face to Face" is a dance-pop song featuring vocals from Todd Edwards, and is more pop-oriented than the other tracks on Discovery. In the context of the album, Bangalter noted that the preceding track "Short Circuit" represented the act of shutting down, and that "Face to Face" represents regaining consciousness and facing reality. "Too Long", the album's closer, is a ten-minute-long electro-R&B song.

Samples
A significant amount of sampling is present on the album. Rather than creating new music using only the samples, Daft Punk worked with them by writing and performing additional parts. The Discovery liner notes specify permitted use of samples for four tracks on the album: Part of George Duke's "I Love You More" is featured in "Digital Love"; Edwin Birdsong's "Cola Bottle Baby" was sampled for "Harder, Better, Faster, Stronger"; The Imperials' song "Can You Imagine" is used for "Crescendolls"; Barry Manilow's "Who's Been Sleeping in My Bed" is credited for "Superheroes". It has been observed that "One More Time" contains a sample of Eddie Johns' song "More Spell on You", despite it being uncredited in the Discovery liner notes. The Los Angeles Times confirmed this following the breakup of Daft Punk and found that Daft Punk does pay royalties for the sample twice a year to the label, GM Musipro.

Several websites list many other samples present on the album, but Bangalter has stated that half of the samples he had seen listed are not true. He also stated the sampling they do is legitimately done, not something they try to hide. Bangalter elaborated that the newly recorded elements were implemented in a way that was equivalent to "creating fake samples [...] where people think there are samples from disco records or funk records." Guy-Manuel de Homem-Christo estimated that half of the sampled material on Discovery was played live by the duo, and emphasized that the resulting quality of the music was more important than the ego of who played which instruments.

Promotion and release

Daft Punk initially planned to release every song on Discovery as a single, according to Orla Lee-Fisher, who was head of marketing for Virgin Records UK at the time, although this plan was eventually shelved. "One More Time" was released in 2000, ahead of the album's release. The album was available on 12 March 2001, with singles of "Aerodynamic", "Digital Love", "Harder, Better, Faster, Stronger", "Something About Us", and "Face to Face" launched afterward.

The ideas for the album's music videos formed during the early Discovery recording sessions. The album was originally intended to be accompanied by "a live-action film with each song being a part of the film", according to Todd Edwards. The band decided instead to concentrate on an anime production. Daft Punk's concept for the film involved the merging of science fiction with entertainment industry culture. The duo recalled watching Japanese anime as children, including favorites such as Captain Harlock, Grendizer, and Candy Candy. All three brought the album and the completed story to Tokyo in the hope of creating the film with their childhood hero, Leiji Matsumoto, who had created Captain Harlock. After Matsumoto joined the team as visual supervisor, Shinji Shimizu had been contacted to produce the animation and Kazuhisa Takenouchi to direct the film.  With the translation coordination of Tamiyuki "Spike" Sugiyama, production began in October 2000 and ended in April 2003. The result of the collaboration was an anime film, Interstella 5555: The 5tory of the 5ecret 5tar 5ystem, which features the entirety of Discovery as the soundtrack.

Daft Punk adopted robot costumes in the lead up to Discoverys release. The group told the press they were working in their studio at 9:09 am on 9 September 1999, when their sampler exploded. They had to undergo reconstructive surgery, and, regaining consciousness, they realized they had become robots.

Shortly before the album's release, the group launched Daft Club, a website that offered exclusive tracks and other bonus material. Every Discovery CD included a Daft Club membership card bearing a unique number that provided personalized access to the website. Bangalter said this was "our way of rewarding people who buy the CD". The service provided by the site ended in 2003; most of the tracks were then compiled into the remix album Daft Club.

Commercial performance
Discovery reached number two on the UK Albums Chart and the French Albums Chart, and number 23 in the US Billboard 200. It debuted at number two on the Canadian Albums Chart, selling 13,850 copies in its first week. It was certified triple platinum in France in 2007 for shipments of 600,000 copies, and certified gold by the Recording Industry Association of America on 11 October 2010.

As of May 2013, Discovery had sold 802,000 copies in the US. "One More Time" was its most successful single, reaching number one on the French charts and the Billboard Hot Dance Club Songs charts, and reaching the top ten on seven other charts. It remained Daft Punk's most successful single until the release of "Get Lucky" in 2013. The album's fifth single, "Face to Face", reached number one on the Billboard Hot Dance Club Songs chart in 2004. Discovery had sold at least 2.6 million copies as of 2005.

Critical reception

Discovery received generally positive reviews from critics. At Metacritic, which assigns a normalized rating out of 100 to reviews from mainstream publications, the album received an average score of 74, based on 19 reviews. AllMusic's John Bush said that, with their comprehensive productions and loops of manifold elements, Daft Punk had developed a sound that was "worthy of bygone electro-pop technicians from Giorgio Moroder to Todd Rundgren to Steve Miller." Q wrote that the album was vigorous and innovative in its exploration of "old questions and spent ideals", hailing it as "a towering, persuasive tour de force" that "transcends the dance label" with no shortage of ideas, humor, or "brilliance". Q named Discovery one of the best 50 albums of 2001.

Joshua Clover, writing in Spin, dubbed Discovery disco's "latest triumph" and said although it "flags a bit" before the end, the opening stretch of songs was on-par with albums such as Prince's Sign o' the Times (1987) and Nirvana's Nevermind (1991). Stephen Dalton from NME found the record's pop art ideas enthralling and credited Daft Punk for "re-inventing the mid-'80s as the coolest pop era ever". In Entertainment Weekly, Will Hermes wrote that the "beat editing and EQ wizardry" still excite after Homework, despite the newly imbued sense of humor. Mixmag called it "the perfect non-pop pop album" and said Daft Punk had "altered the course of dance music for the second time".

Ben Ratliff from Rolling Stone was less impressed and wrote that few songs on Discovery matched the grandiosity of "One More Time". He found most of them "muddled – not only in the spectrum between serious and jokey but in its sense of an identity." In The Guardian, Alexis Petridis felt Daft Punk's attempt to "salvage" older musical references resembled Homework, but was less coherent and successful. Pitchfork critic Ryan Schreiber found the "prog and disco" hybrid "relatively harmless" and said that it was not "meant to be judged on its lyrics", which he dismissed as amateurish and commonplace. Robert Christgau, writing in The Village Voice, facetiously said the album may appeal to young enthusiasts of Berlin techno and computing, but it was too "French" and "" for American tastes. In a retrospective review for The Rolling Stone Album Guide (2004), Douglas Wolk gave Discovery three and a half stars and wrote that "the more [Daft Punk] dumb the album down, the funkier it gets" with an emphasis on hooks over songs.

Legacy
Pitchfork named Discovery the 12th-best album of 2000–04 and the third-best of the decade. In 2021, Pitchfork included Discovery on its list of review scores they "would change if they could", upgrading its score from 6.4 to 10 out of 10. Pitchfork critic Noah Yoo wrote: "If scores are meant to indicate a work's longevity or impact, the original review is invalidated by the historic record. Daft Punk's second album, Discovery, is the centerpiece of their career, an album that transcended the robots' club roots and rippled through the decades that followed."

In 2009, Rhapsody named Discovery the 12th-best album of the decade. It was also named the fourth best album of the decade by Resident Advisor. In 2012, Rolling Stone named Discovery the 30th-greatest EDM album. Rolling Stone included it at number 236 in its 2020 "500 Greatest Albums of All Time" list. The album also was included on BBC Radio 1's Masterpieces in December 2009 presented by Zane Lowe, highlighting its growing standing over the decade.

Several songs were sampled by other artists. Kanye West's song "Stronger" from the album Graduation features a vocal sample of "Harder, Better, Faster, Stronger". A live performance of "Stronger" was featured at the 2008 Grammy Awards, with Daft Punk performing in their trademark pyramid structure while Kanye West was on stage rapping. Wiley's song "Summertime" from the album See Clear Now features a sample of "Aerodynamic". Jazmine Sullivan's song "Dream Big" from the album Fearless features a sample of "Veridis Quo". "One More Time" was sampled in the Drake and 21 Savage song "Circo Loco", from the album Her Loss (2022).

Track listing

Personnel
Adapted from Discovery liner notes.
 Daft Punk – vocals (tracks 3, 4, 9), vocoders, sequencers, sampling, synthesizers, Wurlitzer electric piano, guitars, bass, talkbox, drum machines, production, concept, art direction
 Romanthony – vocals (tracks 1, 14), co-production (track 14)
 Todd Edwards – vocals and co-production (track 13)
 Nilesh Patel – mastering
 Alex & Martin – concept, art direction
 Cedric Hervet – concept, art direction
 Gildas Loaëc – concept, art direction
 Simon Scott – concept, art direction
 Daniel Vangarde – concept, art direction
 Pedro Winter – concept, art direction
 Mitchell Feinberg – liquid metal photos
 Luis Sanchis – piano photo
 Tony Gardner, Alterian – bionics engineering
 Tamiyuki "Spike" Sugiyama – Tokyo connector

Charts

Weekly charts

Year-end charts

Certifications

References

Additional notes

Citations

Bibliography

Further reading

External links
 
 Virgin Records Daft Punk official website for Discovery

2001 albums
Daft Punk albums
Albums produced by Thomas Bangalter
Albums produced by Guy-Manuel de Homem-Christo
Concept albums
Disco albums by French artists
Post-disco albums
French house albums
Virgin Records albums